Gnathostomariidae is a family of worms belonging to the order Bursovaginoidea.

Genera:
 Gnathostomaria Ax, 1956

References

Gnathostomulida
Platyzoa families